Giovanni Maria Falconetto (c. 1468–1535) was an Italian architect and artist. He designed among the first high Renaissance buildings in Padua, the Loggia Cornaro, a garden loggia for Alvise Cornaro built as a Roman doric arcade. Along with his brother, Giovanni Antonio Falconetto, he was among the most prominent painters of Verona and Padua in the early 16th century.

Biography

Falconetto was born in Verona into an established family of Veronese painters and studied in Rome for a time, in the studio of Melozzo da Forlì. On his return to Verona his standing in his rione made him of use to Emperor Maximilian, who was headquartered in Verona from 1509 to 1517, during the episode of the Italian Wars called the War of the League of Cambrai, and not simply for painting imperial arms to replace those of Venice that had been effaced on Maximilian's orders. With the return of a Venetian governor, Falconetto and his family were proscribed and seem to have withdrawn to Trent.

Later his career was passed at Padua, where he was drawn by the patronage of Pietro Bembo and Alvise Cornaro, for whom Falconetto designed the Villa Cornaro at Este (since remodelled), of which an imposing adjacent gate remains. Cornaro's influence with the Bishop of Padua doubtless elicited Falconetto's commission to design the Villa dei Vescovi ("Villa of the Bishops") located in the town limits of Torreglia in the Euganean Hills.

Other works of architecture at Padua include the Loggia Carnica, the Porta S. Giovanni and Porta Savonarola in the city walls, and the arch in Piazza dei Signori. Nearby, he designed the church at Codevigo.

As a painter, several works by Falconetto are in the Museo Civico housed in the Castelvecchio. His frescos in the Duomo reappeared in 1870 from under their coat of whitewash applied in 1630 at a time of plague. Frescoes securely attributed to Falconetto decorate the Sala dello Zodiaco in the Palazzo di Bagno, now within Palazzo d'Arco, Mantua, probably executed c. 1520 for a member of the Gonzaga family, as Vasari remarks, "he produced at Mantua several things for signor Luigi Gonzaga".

He died in Padua in 1535.

Gallery of Salla dello Zodiaco in Mantua

Notes

References

External links 

 C.I. Gable, "Loggia Cornaro"
 Verona.com : Giovanni Maria Falconetto 
 Giovanni Pasetti, "Un ciclo zodiacale del Rinascimento" 

1460s births
1535 deaths
Painters from Verona
15th-century Italian painters
Italian male painters
16th-century Italian painters
Italian Renaissance painters
16th-century Italian architects
Architects from Verona